Kevin Miller (born 15 March 1969) is an English former football goalkeeper who made more than 600 appearances in the Premier League and Football League.

Football career
Born in Falmouth, Cornwall, Miller was a product of the Falmouth Town youth scheme playing mostly in midfield before being persuaded to take up goalkeeping in the Combination League team by then manager Keith Rashleigh as a 15 year old. Miller joined Newquay and enjoyed great success including breaking the South Western League goals conceded record under manager Trevor Mewton.

Miller was then signed by Terry Cooper (ex Leeds and England) for Exeter City where he was a key figure in their Fourth Division Championship winning team, before following Cooper to Birmingham City, Crystal Palace, Barnsley, Bristol Rovers and Derby County (on loan), over an eighteen-year period. During this time he also spent three seasons at Watford, earning the Player of the Season award twice.

His move to Premiership side Crystal Palace from Watford in June 1997 saw the most expensive fee of his career being paid: £1.5million. He had been expected to sign for Nottingham Forest but the East Midlands club failed to agree a fee.

He initially retired from football in August 2005, but in February 2006 he was signed by Southampton manager George Burley, whose side was short on goalkeepers, with Bartosz Białkowski out with an injury, Miller was seen as cover for Paul Smith.

Miller displaced Smith in the first team and played the final seven games of Southampton's 2005–06 season, helping the team to five wins and a draw. This form was appreciated and the club offered him a one-year extension on his contract, which he accepted.

In January 2007, he signed a one-month loan deal with League Two strugglers Torquay United, making his debut on 26 January 2007 in the 4–1 win at home to Grimsby Town, United's first win in 20 league games. He returned to Southampton at the end of the loan spell and was released in May 2007.

Returning to non-league football, Miller joined Bodmin Town in October 2007. He retired from playing at the end of the 2014–15 season, aged 46, then decided to do another season at the club.

Miller was appointed as Exeter City's goalkeeping coach on 9 December 2022, to work under new manager Gary Caldwell.

Career statistics

Honours
Individual
PFA Team of the Year: 1996–97 Second Division

References

External links

1969 births
Living people
Footballers from Cornwall
People from Falmouth, Cornwall
English footballers
Association football goalkeepers
Falmouth Town A.F.C. players
Newquay A.F.C. players
Exeter City F.C. players
Birmingham City F.C. players
Watford F.C. players
Crystal Palace F.C. players
Barnsley F.C. players
Bristol Rovers F.C. players
Derby County F.C. players
Southampton F.C. players
Torquay United F.C. players
Bodmin Town F.C. players
English Football League players
Premier League players
Exeter City F.C. non-playing staff